MalmöMässan is an exhibition and convention centre in Malmö, Sweden. The facility is located in the Hyllie area, close to Malmö Arena and has an area of 20,000 m², divided into exhibition hall, a conference centre and two restaurants.

One of the major annual events held there is Skånemässan ("The Scania fair") held in September and with about 25,000 visitors.

History 

The former Malmömässan Convention Centre in the west harbour area of Malmö closed on 31 March 2010. The old building had an area of 20,000 m² and was originally built as a manufacturing hall by the Kockums shipyard, it was turned into a SAAB factory following the Swedish shipyard crisis of the late 1970s and 1980s.

In the early 1990s MalmöMässan AB, earlier based in Stadionområdet, Malmö ("The stadium area", where Malmö Stadion and Malmö Isstadion are located), relocated there.

A new exhibition hall was built in Hyllie, opened in February 2012 by architect Erik Giudice.

Events 
 Bröllopsmässan Malmö 2014 – February 2014

References

External links

 Official site 

Convention centres in Sweden
Buildings and structures in Malmö
Tourist attractions in Malmö
Event venues in Sweden
Fairgrounds